Debi Mae West is an American voice actress for popular radio, television, animation, and video games. In 2008, she won a Spike Video Game Award for voicing Meryl Silverburgh in Metal Gear Solid 4: Guns of the Patriots and Tsunade in Naruto. From 1999 to 2002, she was a featured performer on Joe Frank's radio programs.

Filmography

Film roles 

 Boyz Up Unauthorized
 Despicable Me – additional voices
 Digimon Frontier: Island of Lost Digimon – Kotemon
 Highlander: The Search for Vengeance – Dahlia (credited as Eid Lakis)
 Naruto Shippuden the Movie – Tsunade
 Naruto Shippuden the Movie: Bonds – Tsunade
 Naruto Shippuden the Movie: The Lost Tower – Tsunade 
 Naruto the Movie: Blood Prison – Tsunade 
 Naruto Shippuden the Movie: The Will of Fire – Tsunade
 Queer Duck: The Movie – Joan Rivers, additional voices
 Road to Ninja: Naruto the Movie – Tsunade
 The Last: Naruto the Movie – Tsunade, Akane
 The Secret of NIMH 2: Timmy to the Rescue – Mrs. Brisby

Anime series 

 Bleach – Hisana Kuchiki
 Digimon Data Squad – Marcus Damon (Young)
 Naruto – Tsunade
 Naruto Shippuden – Tsunade
 Naruto – Mission: Protect the Waterfall Village! – Himatsu
 Naruto – Konoha Annual Sports Festival – Tsunade
 Sailor Moon Sailor Stars - Sailor Lead Crow / Akane Karasuma
 Zatch Bell! – Baransha; Hideaki; Reycom

Animated shows 

 101 Dalmatians: The Series – Lucky (replacing Pamela Adlon)
 Angry Beavers – Termite Queen, Bomb
 Johnny Bravo – Doctor Babe, Soldier Babe #2, Cave Babe, additional voices
 Drawn Together – Vajoana
 Harvey Birdman: Attorney at Law – Gigi, Gleek, Spanish Woman
 Higglytown Heroes – Lighthouse Keeper Hero, Physical Therapist Hero
 Max Steel – Kat
 Superman: The Animated Series – Billy (1 episode)
 The Angry Beavers – Termite Queen

Video game roles 

 Alter Echo – Arana
 ATV Offroad Fury: Blazin' Trails – Announcer
 Blade Kitten – Terra-Li, additional voices
 Evil Dead: Regeneration – Necromancer Queen, Female Deadite 1
 Fallout 76: Wastelanders – Settlers
 God of War: Ascension – Tisiphone
 God of War II – Atropos, Bathhouse Girl #1
 Heroes of the Storm – Maiev Shadowsong
 Lost Planet 2 – Various
 Metal Gear Solid and The Twin Snakes – Meryl Silverburgh
 Metal Gear Solid 4: Guns of the Patriots – Meryl Silverburgh
 Naruto: Ultimate Ninja 2 – Tsunade
 Naruto: Ultimate Ninja Heroes – Tsunade
 Naruto: Clash of Ninja Revolution – Tsunade
 Naruto Shippuden: Ultimate Ninja Storm 2 – Tsunade
 Neopets: The Darkest Faerie – Patricia
 Tales of Symphonia – Sephie, various
 Tekken 5 – Christie Monteiro (Cutscenes Voice)
 Tekken 5: Dark Resurrection – Christie Monteiro (Cutscenes Voice)
 Tenchu 2 - Ayame
 The Chronicles of Riddick: Escape from Butcher Bay – Computer Voice, Elevator Voice
 True Crime: Streets of LA - Additional voices
 Ty the Tasmanian Tiger – Sheila the Koala
 Ty the Tasmanian Tiger 2: Bush Rescue – Birrel, Orchid
 Ty the Tasmanian Tiger 3: Night of the Quinkan – Shazza
 Warcraft III: The Frozen Throne – Maiev Shadowsong, Female Night Elf
 World of Warcraft – Female Night Elf
 World of Warcraft: The Burning Crusade – Maiev Shadowsong
 World of Warcraft: Legion – Maiev Shadowsong
 Zatch Bell! Mamodo Fury – Baransha, Reycom
 Vampire: The Masquerade – Bloodlines – additional voices

References

External links 
 
 
 
 

Living people
Place of birth missing (living people)
American video game actresses
American voice actresses
20th-century American actresses
21st-century American actresses
Year of birth missing (living people)